Lewis John Carlino (January 1, 1932 – June 17, 2020) was an American screenwriter and director. His career spanned five decades and included such works as The Fox, The Brotherhood, The Mechanic, The Sailor Who Fell from Grace with the Sea, I Never Promised You a Rose Garden, Resurrection, and The Great Santini. Carlino was nominated for many awards, including the Academy Award for Best Adapted Screenplay.

Theatrical work
One of Carlino's earliest works was a play, The Brick and the Rose; a collage for voices. It was published on December 12, 1957, and the first production took place that year in the Ivar Theatre, now part of the LA Film School, in Hollywood, California.

The script for The Brick and the Rose was distributed by the Dramatists Play Service beginning in 1959 and the play was presented on television as part of the CBS Repertoire Workshop on January 24, 1960. Carlino continued to write for theater with some success with scripts regularly published by Dramatists Play Service and numerous performances in several venues including the American National Theatre and Academy and the John Golden Theatre.

Screenwriting and directing
Carlino's first screenwriting credit was And Make Thunder His Tribute, Episode 99 of the television series Route 66, which aired on November 1, 1963. That same month, Carlino was hired by Kirk Douglas' film production company, Joel Productions, to write the screenplay for Seconds, based on the novel by science fiction writer David Ely. The lead in the film was initially written for Douglas but the role was eventually played by Rock Hudson, with Joel Productions co-producing the film with John Frankenheimer Productions, director John Frankenheimer's film production company. This conspiracy thriller gained considerable attention as the final part of a loosely connected paranoia trilogy from the director. The film was submitted in competition at the 1966 Cannes Film Festival and was one of the nominees for the Palme D'Or.

Carlino next worked with screenwriter Howard Koch on the adaptation of the 1923 novella The Fox by D. H. Lawrence. The 1967 film (starring Sandy Dennis, Anne Heywood, and Keir Dullea), won a Best Foreign Film Golden Globe Award, and Heywood earned the Best Actress award. The screenplay by Carlino and Koch was nominated for the Golden Globe for Best Screenplay of 1967. The following year, Carlino was nominated for the Writers Guild of America Award for the Best Written American Original Screenplay of 1968 for his work on The Brotherhood, which starred Kirk Douglas and was directed by Martin Ritt.

In 1970 he wrote an adaptation of the classic Robert Heinlein novel Stranger in a Strange Land, picked up by Warner Bros and listed for production in early 1971. The movie was never made.

Carlino wrote the original story and the screenplay for the 1972 film The Mechanic, which stars Charles Bronson and Jan-Michael Vincent. The film is noted for opening with no dialog for the first 16 minutes and for its surprise ending.

In 1976, Carlino adapted  Yukio Mishima's 1963 novel The Sailor Who Fell from Grace with the Sea for the screen and directed the film of the same title which starred Kris Kristofferson and Sarah Miles.

Carlino and Gavin Lambert received an Oscar nomination and the Writers Guild of America Award nomination for the Best Adapted Screenplay of 1977 for I Never Promised You a Rose Garden.

Carlino wrote and directed The Great Santini, based on the 1976 novel by Pat Conroy. The film tells the story of a United States Marine Corps Officer whose success as a military aviator contrasts with his shortcomings as a husband and father. The film stars Robert Duvall, Blythe Danner, Michael O'Keefe, Lisa Jane Persky, Julie Anne Haddock, Brian Andrews, Stan Shaw, and David Keith. Carlino was nominated for the Writers Guild of America Award of 1979 for the Best Drama Adapted from Another Medium. The Great Santini received two Academy Award nominations:  Best Actor in a Leading Role (Duvall) and Best Actor in a Supporting Role (O'Keefe).

In 1980, Carlino did the original writing and screenplay for Resurrection and was nominated by the Academy of Science Fiction, Fantasy & Horror Films for the Saturn Award for Best Writing of 1980.

Filmography
 CBS Repertoire Workshop (1 episode) – "The Brick and the Rose"
 Route 66 (1 episode, 1963) – "And Make Thunder His Tribute" (1963) TV episode (writer)
 Tupp tupp men ingen höna (1966) (TV) (writer)
 Seconds (1966) (screenplay)
 The Fox (1967) (screenplay)... aka "D.H. Lawrence's The Fox" – USA (complete title)
 The Brotherhood (1968) (writer), (technical supervisor)
 Prodajem stara kola (1968) (TV) (writer)
 Zid i ruza (1970) (TV) (writer)
 In Search of America (1971) (TV) (writer)
 The Mechanic (1972) (screenplay), (story) ... aka "Killer of Killers" – USA (reissue title)
 Doc Elliott (1 episode, 1973) – Pilot (1973) TV episode (writer)
 Honor Thy Father (1973) (CBS miniseries) (writer)
 A Reflection of Fear (1973) (writer)
 Crazy Joe (1974) (writer)
 Where Have All the People Gone? (1974) (TV) (screenplay), (story)
 The Sailor Who Fell from Grace with the Sea (1976) (written for the screen by), (director)
 I Never Promised You a Rose Garden (1977) (screenplay)
 The Great Santini (1979) (writer), (director)
 Resurrection (1980) (written by)
 Class (1983) (director)
 Haunted Summer (1988) (writer)
 Resurrection (1999) (TV) (earlier screenplay) (story)

References

External links
 

1932 births
2020 deaths
American male screenwriters
Film directors from New York City
Screenwriters from New York (state)